Union Township is one of the twenty-five townships of Muskingum County, Ohio, United States.  The 2000 census found 4,359 people in the township, 1,595 of whom lived in the unincorporated portions of the township.

Geography
Located on the eastern edge of the county, it borders the following townships:
Highland Township - north
Adams Township, Guernsey County - northeast corner
Westland Township, Guernsey County - east
Rich Hill Township - south
Salt Creek Township - southwest
Perry Township - west
Salem Township - northwest corner

Two incorporated villages are located in Union Township: New Concord in the northeast, and Norwich in the northwest.

Name and history
It is one of twenty-seven Union Townships statewide.

In 1833, Union Township contained two post offices, four churches, one saw mill, and two physicians.

Government
The township is governed by a three-member board of trustees, who are elected in November of odd-numbered years to a four-year term beginning on the following January 1. Two are elected in the year after the presidential election and one is elected in the year before it. There is also an elected township fiscal officer, who serves a four-year term beginning on April 1 of the year after the election, which is held in November of the year before the presidential election. Vacancies in the fiscal officership or on the board of trustees are filled by the remaining trustees.

References

External links
County website

Townships in Muskingum County, Ohio
Townships in Ohio